Ghulam is an Arabic name.

Ghulam or Gholam may also refer to:

 Gholam Ali, Sistan and Baluchestan, a village in Iran
 Ghulam (film), a 1998 Hindi film
 Ghulam, or Ghilman, slave soldiers

See also

 Ghulami (disambiguation)
 Gulam, an Indian practitioner of pehlwani